Robert Joseph DeWeese (November 8, 1915 – April 25, 1991) was an American professional basketball player. He played in the National Basketball League for the Kankakee Gallagher Trojans in just two games during the 1937–38 season and averaged 1.0 point per game. DeWeese served in the United States Navy during World War II.

References 

1915 births
1991 deaths
American men's basketball players
United States Navy personnel of World War II
Basketball players from Indiana
Guards (basketball)
Kankakee Gallagher Trojans players
People from White County, Indiana
Military personnel from Indiana